Arwaliya is a village in the Bhopal district of Madhya Pradesh, India. It is located in the Huzur tehsil and the Phanda block.

In 2016, it was identified as one of the 6 sites for relocation of Bhopal city dairies, as per the National Green Tribunal norms.

Demographics 

According to the 2011 census of India, Arwaliya has 239 households. The effective literacy rate (i.e. the literacy rate of population excluding children aged 6 and below) is 75.75%.

References 

Villages in Huzur tehsil